Ghita Beltman (born 5 April 1978 in Haastrecht) is a road cyclist from the Netherlands. She competed in the women's road race at the UCI Road World Championships in 1999, 2000, 2001, 2003 and 2004. In 2004, she won Stage 5 of the Tour de l'Aude Cycliste Féminin.

References

External links
 profile at procyclingstats.com
 profile at dewielersite.nl

1978 births
Dutch female cyclists
UCI Road World Championships cyclists for the Netherlands
People from Krimpenerwaard
Living people
Cyclists from South Holland